Charles Andrew Willard (May 21, 1857 – March 13, 1914) was a United States district judge of the United States District Court for the District of Minnesota.

Education and career

Born in St. Johnsbury, Vermont, Willard received an Artium Baccalaureus degree from Dartmouth College in 1877, and a Bachelor of Laws from Boston University School of Law in 1879. He was in private practice in St. Johnsbury from 1879 to 1882, then in Saint Paul, Minnesota until 1885, and then in Minneapolis, Minnesota until 1901. He was a lecturer at the University of Minnesota from 1887 to 1901. He was a United States Territorial Judge of the Supreme Court of the Philippine Islands from 1901 to 1909.

Federal judicial service

On May 8, 1909, Willard was nominated by President William Howard Taft to a seat on the United States District Court for the District of Minnesota vacated by Judge Milton D. Purdy. Willard was confirmed by the United States Senate on May 18, 1909, and received his commission the same day. He served in that capacity until his death on March 13, 1914, in Minneapolis.

References

Sources
 

1857 births
1914 deaths
Associate Justices of the Supreme Court of the Philippines
Judges of the United States District Court for the District of Minnesota
United States district court judges appointed by William Howard Taft
20th-century American judges
People from St. Johnsbury, Vermont
Dartmouth College alumni
Boston University School of Law alumni